Etowah is a town in Cleveland County, Oklahoma, United States. The population was 92 at the 2010 census.

Geography
Etowah is located at  (35.134592, -97.168620).

Demographics

At the 2010 census, there were 92 people, 42 households, and 34 families in the town. The racial makeup of the town was 93.44% White, 0.82% Native American, and 5.74% from two or more races. Hispanic or Latino of any race were 3.28% of the population.

Of the 42 households 45.2% had children under the age of 18 living with them, 78.6% were married couples living together, and 19.0% were non-families. 19.0% of households were one person and 4.8% were one person aged 65 or older. The average household size was 2.90 and the average family size was 3.32.

The age distribution was 32.0% under the age of 18, 11.5% from 18 to 24, 32.8% from 25 to 44, 18.0% from 45 to 64, and 5.7% 65 or older. The median age was 31 years. For every 100 females, there were 121.8 males. For every 100 females age 18 and over, there were 102.4 males.

The median household income was $34,375 and the median family income  was $34,375. Males had a median income of $26,786 versus $25,833 for females. The per capita income for the town was $10,190. None of the population and none of the families were below the poverty line.

References

External links
 Encyclopedia of Oklahoma History and Culture - Etowah

Oklahoma City metropolitan area
Towns in Cleveland County, Oklahoma
Towns in Oklahoma